is a fighting video game developed and released by Namco Bandai Games for the PlayStation 3 and Xbox 360 in 2012.

The sixth main installment in Namco's Soulcalibur series of fighting games, Soulcalibur V is the follow-up to Soulcalibur IV and retains the weapon-based combat that characterizes the series but follows a new character, Patroklos, who aims to rid his sister of a curse brought upon her by an ancient weapon. It is the last original Soul series timeline game.

The game received positive reviews, in which it was praised for its gameplay, atmosphere and character creation, but was criticized for the removal of fan favorite characters and for its story mode.

Gameplay

Like the previous games in the series, Soulcalibur V is a weapon-based fighting game. Players use high and low vertical and horizontal attacks to damage opposing player characters and can block incoming attacks or parry enemies' moves to gain a tactical advantage. The game features a tweaked "Critical Edge" system, allowing players to fill up a meter and unleash powerful special attacks.

The game features a variety of gameplay modes. In Story Mode, players take control of the game's protagonist Patroklos and various supporting characters, guiding him through a series of battles divided into 20 episodes. Unlike previous installments, not every character is playable in Story Mode. The game's arcade mode allows players to control any of the game's characters and face six opponents in time trial matches. In addition, the game features Quick Battle mode, which allows players to unlock titles for their online profiles and an extra "Legendary Souls" mode. Like its predecessors, Soulcalibur V also sports variety of multiplayer modes, allowing players to face each other both online and offline. The character creation mode from previous games has also been retained.

Plot
The game takes place in 1607, 17 years after the events of Soulcalibur IV, and centers around the children of Soul series veteran Sophitia. Her son, Patrokolos, is working as a soldier for Graf Dumas, the Roman Empire's appointed ruler of Hungary, and is tasked with eliminating the "malfested", a curse that is bestowed upon whoever comes into contact with the evil weapon Soul Edge, in exchange for his help in locating his sister Pyrrha, who has been missing since he was a kid. Searching a town in order to root out malfested, he is attacked and defeated by half-werewolf Z.W.E.I, who tells him that Dumas is not who he seems. Confronting him about this, Patrokolos learns that Dumas is actually aligned with Soul Edge and the 'malfested' he had been order to kill were actually innocent people he needed to die so he can restore the blade.

Escaping Dumas' control, Patrokolos tracks down Z.W.E.I., who is a member of Siegfried's revived Schwarzwind. Siegfried indoctrinates him into the group and informs him that Pyrrha is being held captive by Soul Edge devotee Tira and assigns Z.W.E.I. and Schwarzwind mystic Viola to accompany him. After a brief skirmish, Tira seemingly releases Pyrrha to her brother, who abandons Z.W.E.I. and Viola in order to bring her sister home. However, upon arriving in Greece, they are confronted by Dumas, who was actually the vessel of Soul Edge's physical form, Nightmare. Complicating matters is that, upon Patrokolos' swift defeat, Pyrrha is a malfested, having been slowly corrupted by Tira in the 17 years since she captures her. Unable to process what he's seeing, Patrokos runs away in horror upon Nightmare's defeat, causing a distraught Pyrrha to wholeheartedly side with Tira.

Returning to the Schwarzwind base, Siegfried entrusts Patrokolos with Soul Calibur, the only weapon with the power to save his sister and stop Nightmare. However, it has changed forms and had become severely weakened in the years since its last battle with Soul Edge. Looking to strengthen the blade, Patrokolos tracks down Nightmare's former pawn Ivy, who informs him that she knows a ritual to strengthen the blade but that it requires its other two counterparts, Krita-Yuga and Dvapara-Yuga, which are in the possession of a young staff fighter named Xiba and Xinaghua's daughter Leixia. During the ritual, Patrokolos has a vision of his mother Sophitia, who tells him that the only way to save Pyrrha is to kill her. During this time, Nightmare wages war on Europe in order to strengthen Soul Edge, with Schwarzwind fighting to stop him. Z.W.E.I. manages to get ahead and kill the still weakened Nightmare, but is quickly disposed of by Tira and Pyrrha, who proceed with Tira's true goal: though still loyal to Soul Edge, Tira found that Nightmare no longer fit the mold and had been grooming Pyrrha to take his place. However, as soon as Pyrrha picks up the demonic blade, Patrokolos arrives and kills her with Soul Calibur.

Shell shocked by what he did, Patrokolos' mind winds up in Astral Chaos, where an encounter with Edge Master convinces him to travel back and save Pyrrha by removing Soul Edge, thereby severing its control over her. However, 'Sophitia' is less than pleased that Patrokolos deviated from the plan and encases him in glass, intending to take over his body to do the job he couldn't. When Pyrrha comes to her senses, her desperate attempt to have Soul Edge save her brother frees his mind enough to allow him to confront his 'mother' who reveals herself to be Elysium, the spirit of Soul Calibur. After a long battle, Patrokolos is freed from Elysium's control, and together, he and Pyrrha seal away both swords.

After Patroklos and Pyrrha sealed the two swords into the Astral Chaos, Cassandra, who had been missing for years, appears in the new timeline where she tells her younger self about the grim future of the Alexandra family.

Characters

The game features 28 playable characters, including 10 characters that are new to the series. The new characters include two versions of Pyrrha and Patroklos. The game also introduces the mysterious Z.W.E.I. as well as Viola, an amnesiac fortune teller (later revealed to be Raphael's grown-up adopted daughter Amy Sorel). Several new characters use the fighting styles of previous characters in the series: Taki's student and successor Natsu, Xianghua's daughter Yan Leixia and her illegitimate eldest son Xiba, who uses a fighting style of his long-lost father, Kilik.

The game also features a number of returning characters, such as Siegfried, Voldo, Ivy, Tira, Algol, Aeon (Lizardman), Hilde, Kilik, Maxi, Mitsurugi, Raphael, Yoshimitsu, Cervantes, Nightmare, Dampierre (who first appeared in Soulcalibur: Broken Destiny), and Ezio Auditore da Firenze from the Assassin's Creed series.

Aeon Calcos
Algol 
Astaroth
Cervantes
Dampierre 
Devil Jin 
Edge Master 
Elysium  
Ezio Auditore da Firenze 
Heishiro Mitsurugi
Hilde
Ivy
Kilik 
Leixia 
Maxi
Natsu 
Nightmare
Patroklos Alexander 
Patroklos Alexandra (Alpha)  
Pyrrha Alexandra 
Pyrrha Alexandra (Omega)  
Raphael
Siegfried
Tira
Viola 
Voldo
Xiba 
Yoshimitsu
Z.W.E.I. 

 Newcomers 
 Guest character 
 Unlockable 
 DLC only 
 Moveset available through Character Creation

Development

A petition for Soulcalibur V posted on Facebook caught the attention of Katsuhiro Harada, producer of Namco's Tekken series. He accepted suggestions and promised to lobby on behalf of fans for the creation of a new Soulcalibur game. The game was teased as early as 2010, when game director Daishi Odashima tweeted "SC is back!". On December 25, 2010, a new Soul series project was announced to be under way, led by a new director. In late April 2011, Odashima tweeted again saying "Hopefully I will be able to announce something mid May." Soulcalibur V was officially announced by Namco Bandai on May 11, 2011.

Development of the game's story mode was outsourced to CyberConnect2, developers of the Capcom game Asura's Wrath. The story was originally planned to be four times longer, but it got cut back due to time and manpower restraints.

Release

Pre-order bonuses included the playable character Dampierre from Soulcalibur: Broken Destiny. A collector's edition of Soulcalibur V was released along with the standard edition in a book-like package containing the game, the CD game music soundtrack, The Art of SoulCalibur V book, the making-of DVD, and exclusive White and Dark Knight character creation downloadable content.

Namco has released additional downloadable content for the game. The first "Launch Day" pack includes a set of character customization items described as "exotic" as well as music from Soul Edge and Soulcalibur. The Valentine's Day February 14 pack includes customization items described as "fearsome", along with music from Soulcalibur II and Soulcalibur III. The February 28 pack includes more customization items and music from Soulcalibur IV and Soulcalibur: Broken Destiny. The music tracks are also available individually. Further DLC packs were announced and planned to be released once a month.

Reception

Critical reception of Soulcalibur V was generally positive with average Metacritic scores of 77 (Xbox 360) and 81 (PS3). Jose Otero of 1Up.com criticized the story mode, but was overall positive in its review, stating that the game "reinvents the series again". PSM3 said it was "Faster and more aggressive, SCV is what the series needed. Long term fans may bemoan the changes, but this is the perfect starting point for newcomers." Adam Biessener of Game Informer called it "the best Soulcalibur ever." On the other hand, IGN Steven Lambrechts wrote that Soulcalibur V "feels like more of the same" and was disappointed by the game, especially criticizing its main story mode. Jordan Mallory of Joystiq claims that Soulcalibur V "is simultaneously one of the best Soul Calibur games ever made, as well as the worst Soul Calibur game ever made." Besides the story mode, many disliked the absence of the series's stalwart female characters such as Sophitia, Talim, Cassandra, Xianghua, Taki, and Seong Mi-na.

Soulcalibur V got to number 4 in the UK PS3 sales charts, and number 3 on the Xbox. In eight months, the game had sold 1.38 million units worldwide, somewhat less than the 2.3 million copies of Soulcalibur IV that were sold during its first eight months.

References

External links

2012 video games
3D fighting games
Assassin's Creed
Bandai Namco games
Crossover fighting games
Fighting games used at the Evolution Championship Series tournament
Fighting games used at the Super Battle Opera tournament
Multiplayer and single-player video games
Video games with AI-versus-AI modes
PlayStation 3 games
Soulcalibur series games
Fighting games
Video games scored by Andrew Aversa
Video games scored by Cris Velasco
Video games scored by Hiroki Kikuta
Video games scored by Inon Zur
Video games scored by Jesper Kyd
Video games scored by Junichi Nakatsuru
Video games developed in Japan
Video games featuring female protagonists
Video games set in the 17th century
Video game sequels
Xbox 360 games